Talaroo is a locality in the Shire of Etheridge, Queensland, Australia.

Geography 
The terrain in the north and west of the locality is mountainous with a number of named peaks including Mount Direction , Mount Max , and Mount Noble  all in the north of the locality.

The Einasleigh River flows from the south-west to the north of the locality.

History 
The locality was named and bounded on 23 June 2000.

References 

Shire of Etheridge
Localities in Queensland